The  is a Grade 1 flat horse race in Japan for four-year-old and above thoroughbreds. It is run over a distance of 1,600 metres (approximately 8 furlongs) at Tokyo Racecourse in late February.

It was first run in 1984 as February Handicap, and was given Domestic Grade 3 status. This was elevated to Domestic Grade 2 in 1994, Domestic Grade 1 in 1997, and to its present level in 2007.

It was renamed February Stakes in 1994. Horses from National Association of Racing(NAR) have been eligible to run in the race since 1995, and 2007 for horses not trained in Japan. This race and Champions Cup are the only Grade 1 dirt race organized by the JRA (the other international Grade 1 dirt race (Tokyo Daishōten) and domestic Grade1 races are all organized by NAR).

It is considered as the stepping race to the Dubai World Cup Night meetings' dirt races.

Records
Speed record:
 1.33.8 – Cafe Pharoah (2022)

Most wins by a horse (2): 
 Copano Rickey (2014, 2015)
 Cafe Pharoah (2021, 2022)

Most wins by a jockey (5):
 Yutaka Take (2003, 2006, 2008, 2015, 2019)

Most wins by a trainer (3):
 Akira Murayama (2012, 2014, 2015)

Most wins by an owner (2):
 Katsumi Yoshida (2012, 2017)
 Sachiaki Kobayashi (2014, 2015)
 Shadai Race Horse Co (2003, 2013)
 Takao Matsuoka (2002, 2007)
 Yoshio Matsumoto (1993, 2005)
 Koichi Nishikawa (2021, 2022)

Winners

# Meisei Opera, winner of the 1999 race, belongs to the National Association of Racing(NAR) but not Japan Racing Association(JRA).* The 2003 race took place at Nakayama Racecourse in distance of 1,800m.

See also
 Horse racing in Japan
 List of Japanese flat horse races

References 
Racing Post: 

External links 
Horse Racing in Japan
 results from 1997

Open mile category horse races
Dirt races in Japan
Breeders' Cup Challenge series
Recurring sporting events established in 1984
1984 establishments in Japan